Tomodachi Collection is a social simulation video game for the Nintendo DS, released exclusively in Japan on June 18, 2009. A sequel, Tomodachi Life, was released for the Nintendo 3DS in Japan on April 18, 2013, and in North America and Europe on June 6, 2014.

Gameplay

The cast consists entirely of user created Miis. Players can transfer Miis directly from their Wii console to their Nintendo DS or create new ones using the in-game Mii Maker. The player can choose the personalities of the Miis with up to 16 combinations of personalities. The player can then help their Miis with their problems, such as making friends and performing everyday tasks, as well as giving them clothes, food, and special items to help them gain experience. The Miis can interact with each-other in relationships, such as friendships. When a Mii gains enough experience, they level up and collect rewards. New areas and shops are unlocked on the island by playing the game and meeting various conditions, such as the Question Hall,  where you can ask your Miis anything as well, as making them vote on a certain choice.

Development

Because the Nintendo DS didn't have Miis in the first Nintendo DS Games (Miis were released on November 19, 2006, on the Wii), the Miis were only shown in various Wii games, like Wii Play, Wii Sports, Wii Music and other games. Miis first appeared on the DS two years later in 2008, in Personal Trainer: Walking. Tomodachi Collection was released one year later, only in Japan, on June 18, 2009. Although it was only released in Japan, it was fan-translated and released on November 9, 2013, in American English by jjjewel.

Tomodachi Collection was developed by a small team at Nintendo SPD Group No.1 with Yoshio Sakamoto as a producer. According to a Japanese Iwata Asks interview, it was conceived as a “version that adult women can play” of the 2000 Japan-only fortune-telling Hamtaro video game "Tottoko Hamtaro: Tomodachi Daisakusen Dechu", and was originally titled . In the same interview, it was revealed that the fukuwarai-inspired character creation originally developed for Tomodachi Collection became the foundation for Miis.

A western release was considered, according to an interview with Gamekult.fr. However, issues with localizing the vocal synthesizer software to handle English words (which was resolved in Tomodachi Life) caused the release to be cancelled.

There is a function only found in the Japanese version of Tomodachi Life that allows you to call the Mii from the Tomodachi Collection, and you can copy and transfer the Miis onto the 3DS, but the newly created Miis are added in the Mii Studio. It is not possible to send the Mii to the Tomodachi Collection from Mii Maker.

Sequel

A sequel for the game on the Nintendo 3DS, titled Tomodachi Collection: New Life, was released in Japan on April 18, 2013, and on June 6, 2014 in North America and Europe as Tomodachi Life. The game was the best-selling game in Japan during the week of its release, selling about 404,858 units.

Reception
Famitsu gave Tomodachi Collection a rating of 29 out of 40. It was a best-selling game in Japan during the week of its release, selling about 102,000 units. By September 28, 2009, it sold 1.15 million copies in total, making it the fourth-best selling game in Japan in the first half of the 2009 fiscal year. At the end of the 2009–2010 fiscal year on March 31, 2010, Nintendo reported that the game had sold 3.2 million units.

Notes

References

External links
Official Site 

2009 video games
Life simulation games
Social simulation video games
Nintendo DS games
Nintendo DS-only games
Nintendo games
Japan-exclusive video games
Video games developed in Japan
Video games set on fictional islands
Fan translation